Narsapur formally Gandi Narsapuram, is a census town in Medak district of the Indian state of Telangana. It is located in Narsapur mandal.

 
Narsapur is a Municipality. Narsapur is located 50 km from Hyderabad

Demographics 
Telugu is the Local Language. The total population of Narsapur is 14,735. Males account for 7,691 and 7,044 females. 2,733 live in  houses. The total area of Narsapur is 2,264 hectares.

Colleges 
 Padmasri Dr. B. V. Raju Institute of Technology 
 Ellenki Degree College
 Osmania PG College 
 DSR Junior College

References 

Towns in Medak district